Vansittart Island may refer to:

Vansittart Island in Tasmania
Nagjuttuuq in the Canadian Arctic Archipeligo; previously known as Vansittart Island